Piotr Kamrowski (born 10 September 1967) is a Polish judoka. He competed at the 1992 Summer Olympics and the 1996 Summer Olympics.

References

1967 births
Living people
Polish male judoka
Olympic judoka of Poland
Judoka at the 1992 Summer Olympics
Judoka at the 1996 Summer Olympics
People from Tychy